Sonnjoch (2,457 m) is a mountain of the Karwendel range in the Northern Limestone Alps in Tyrol, Austria. It lies between the Falzthurntal valley, near the village of Pertisau, in the east and the Eng Valley to the west. It is a prominent mountain, which dominates the valleys below it, and appears to rise vertically above Falzthurntal. Another spectacular viewpoint is from Achen Lake. It is a popular hiking peak, with a relatively easy route, so it can get busy in summer.

References

Mountains of the Alps
Karwendel
Mountains of Tyrol (state)